In enzymology, a cyclohexylamine oxidase is an enzyme that catalyzes the chemical reaction

cyclohexylamine + O2 + H2O  cyclohexanone + NH3 + H2O2

The 3 substrates of this enzyme are cyclohexylamine, O2, and H2O, whereas its 3 products are cyclohexanone, NH3, and H2O2.

This enzyme belongs to the family of oxidoreductases, specifically those acting on the CH-NH2 group of donors with oxygen as acceptor.  The systematic name of this enzyme class is cyclohexylamine:oxygen oxidoreductase (deaminating). This enzyme participates in caprolactam degradation.  It employs one cofactor, FAD.

References

 

EC 1.4.3
Flavoproteins
Enzymes of unknown structure